Laganbank was one of the nine district electoral areas in Belfast, Northern Ireland which existed from 1985 to 2014. Located in the south of the city, the district elected five members to Belfast City Council and contained the wards of Ballynafeigh, Botanic, Shaftesbury, Stranmillis, and Rosetta. Laganbank, along with neighbouring Balmoral, formed the greater part of the Belfast South constituencies for the Northern Ireland Assembly and UK Parliament.

The district was bound to the west by the Malone Road and the M1 Motorway, to the south by the River Lagan and the southern section of the Annadale Embankment, to the east by the Ormeau Park and the Ormeau Road and to the north by College Square North and the Cathedral Quarter. The River Lagan, which gave the district its name, flowed through the centre of the district dividing it in two, with Botanic, Shaftesbury and Stranmillis on the western bank and Ballynafeigh and Rosetta on the eastern bank. Laganbank also contained most of the city centre, including Donegall Square.

The south of the district contained some of the most exclusive addresses in Northern Ireland, particularly along the Malone Road. However, the north of the district has areas that suffer economic deprivation, including Donegall Road, Sandy Row and 'the Markets'.

History
Laganbank was created for the 1985 local elections. The Shaftesbury ward had previously been in Area F, Stranmillis and Botanic wards in Area C and Rosetta and Ballynafeigh wards in Area A. For the 2014 local elections, the district was abolished. With the exception of the Rosetta ward, which joined a new Lisnasharragh District Electoral Area, the district's redrawn wards formed part of a new Botanic District Electoral Area, together with the wards of Blackstaff and Windsor, which had previously been part of Balmoral District Electoral Area

Education
Laganbank was the location for several of the city's most important education establishments, including Queen's University Belfast (which gives its name to the Queen's Quarter), Stranmillis University College and Union Theological College, as well as the College Square campus of Belfast Metropolitan College. The location of these institutions in close proximity saw the area's popularity among students increase, particularly in the Holyland area.

The area was also home to some of the most prominent schools, including Aquinas Diocesan Grammar School, Methodist College Belfast ('Methody') and the Royal Belfast Academical Institution.

Culture

The portion of Laganbank to the west of the River Lagan-based around Queen's University, forms the Queen's Quarter, and contains many of the key cultural facilities within the city. The Quarter is home to the Belfast Festival at Queen's, the largest annual arts festival in Ireland, as well as amenities such as the Botanic Gardens, the Brian Friel Theatre, the Crescent Arts Centre, the Elmwood Hall, the Lyric Theatre, the Naughton Gallery at Queen's, the Queen's Film Theatre and the Ulster Museum.

As well as the Queen's Quarter, there are a number of important cultural attractions within the Laganbank section of the city centre, including the Grand Opera House, the Linen Hall Library, the Ormeau Baths Gallery, the Ulster Hall, the Ulster Orchestra and the Waterfront Hall. This area is also sometimes referred to as the Golden Mile because of the large number of bars, clubs and restaurants located there.

Rosemary Jenkinson wrote the play, "The Dealer of Ballynafeigh," about a 42-year-old UDF resident of Ballynafeigh and his mother who deal drugs to pay off debts. It was performed at the Keegan Theatre on Church St. in Washington, DC, USA from 17 October to 14 November 2015.  The play came in third in the BBC Tony Doyle Awards.

Laganbank has a low White population compared to Belfast and is one of the most ethnically diverse electoral areas in Northern Ireland.

Note: There is no ethnic group in the Northern Irish census named White British, instead there is only an ethnic group named White. This covers people from many different areas including Britain, Mainland Europe, Australia and the US.

Other amenities

Other noteworthy amenities in the Laganbank district electoral area include:

 Belfast City Hall
 Belfast City Hospital
 Belfast Central, Botanic, Great Victoria Street and City Hospital railway stations
 Broadcasting House (BBC Northern Ireland)
 Crown Liquor Saloon
 Europa Hotel
 Havelock House (UTV)
 Queen's University Belfast Students' Union
 Royal Courts of Justice
 St George's Market
 St Malachy's Church
 Victoria Square Shopping Centre
 Windsor House

Wards

Councillors

 In May 2011, Christopher Stalford (Democratic Unionist Party) was appointed as an Alderman of Belfast City Council.

2011 Elections

See also
Belfast City Council
Electoral wards of Belfast
Laganside Corporation
Local government in Northern Ireland
Members of Belfast City Council

References

1985 establishments in Northern Ireland
2014 disestablishments in Northern Ireland
Former District Electoral Areas of Belfast